In My Prime Vol. 2 is an album by drummer Art Blakey and the Jazz Messengers recorded in 1977 and released on the Dutch Timeless label.

Reception

Allmusic awarded the album 3 stars stating that "Despite the changes in musical fashions, Art Blakey and his hard-bop institution were still turning out new material and solos in the late '70s that sound fresh and alive today".

Track listing 
All compositions by Robert Watson except as indicated
 "Hawkman" - 9:25   
 "People Who Laugh" (Slide Hampton) - 6:15   
 "Time Will Tell" - 9:26   
 "Ronnie's a Dynamite Lady" (Walter Davis, Jr.) - 8:10

Personnel 
Art Blakey - drums
Valery Ponomarev - trumpet
Curtis Fuller - trombone
Robert Watson - alto saxophone
David Schnitter - tenor saxophone
James Williams - piano
Dennis Irwin - bass
Ray Mantilla - percussion

References 

Art Blakey albums
The Jazz Messengers albums
1978 albums
Timeless Records albums
Sequel albums